During the 1963–64 English football season, Brentford competed in the Football League Third Division. Despite expectations that the club could achieve a second-successive promotion, poor form in  late 1963 and early 1964 led to a mid-table finish.

Season summary 
After a single-season stay in the Fourth Division, Brentford had returned to the Third Division as champions for the 1963–64 season. A large outlay had been made on new signings during the previous 12 months and though chairman Jack Dunnett stated that the club's big-spending days were a thing of the past, he would continue to make money available to manager Malky MacDonald during the season. There was very little transfer activity during the 1963 off-season, with half backs Willie Smith and Bill Slater coming in (Slater returned to Griffin Park after 11 years away) and £5,000 was spent on Liverpool full back Allan Jones as a replacement for the inexperienced Tom Anthony. Redevelopment work was carried out on Griffin Park throughout the summer, with floodlight pylons erected at each corner of the ground, while new club offices and a bar were built into the Braemar Road stand.

Brentford had what was perceived to be a poor start to the season and sat in mid-table after 10 matches. Expectations had been high after the Fourth Division championship triumph at the end of the previous season, but defeat to an attractive Coventry City side (managed by former Brentford player Jimmy Hill) on 5 October 1963 highlighted the gulf between the Third and Fourth Divisions. In the wake of the defeat, Brentford rapidly recovered and won six and drew two of the following 10 matches, which included a 9–0 thrashing of Wrexham at Griffin Park, a result which remains as the club's record Football League win. The team's form collapsed in late November 1963 and despite something of a recovery after a spell of over three months without a league win, the Bees were consigned to a 15th-place finish. Some success was had in the FA Cup with a run to the fourth round, but after seeing off Second Division Middlesbrough in the third round, Fourth Division strugglers Oxford United took Brentford to a replay in the fourth round and then emerged 2–1 victors at Griffin Park.

100 goals were scored during the season, just two shy of the total set during the previous campaign, but the team's achilles heel was the goalkeeping position, with four players vying for the position, though November 1963 signing Chic Brodie would eventually make the position his own. The end of the 1963–64 season was notable for the retirement of full back and captain Ken Coote. He had made 559 appearances and scored 15 goals over the course of 15 seasons for Brentford and is the club's all-time record appearance maker.

A large number of record were set or equalled during the season:
 Record Football League win: 9–0 versus Wrexham, 15 October 1963
 Most goals conceded in a home Football League defeat: 6 (2–6 versus Luton Town, 8 February 1964)
 Most consecutive matches without failing to score a Football League goal: 26 (4 March – 14 September 1963)
 Most consecutive matches without failing to score a home Football League goal: 41 (21 August 1962 – 28 March 1964)
 Most Football League away draws in a season: 10
 Most home Football League goals conceded in a season: 36
 Quickest time to reach 50 Football League goals in a season: 22 matches

League table

Results
Brentford's goal tally listed first.

Legend

Football League Third Division

FA Cup

Football League Cup 

 Sources: 100 Years Of Brentford, Statto

Playing squad 
Players' ages are as of the opening day of the 1963–64 season.

 Sources: 100 Years Of Brentford, Timeless Bees

Coaching staff

Statistics

Appearances and goals

Players listed in italics left the club mid-season.
Source: 100 Years Of Brentford

Goalscorers 

Players listed in italics left the club mid-season.
Source: 100 Years Of Brentford

Management

Summary

Transfers & loans

References 

Brentford F.C. seasons
Brentford